The siege of Vidin was an attempt by the Serbian Army to seize the Bulgarian city of Vidin during the Second Balkan War. The siege took place between 12 and 18 July, 1913.

Background
At the war's start, the Bulgarian First Army was situated in north-western Bulgaria. Its advance into Serbian territory was successful between 22 and 25 June, but Romania's unexpected intervention in the war and the Bulgarian Army's retreat from the front against Greece forced the Bulgarian chief of staff to transfer most of the country's troops into the region of Macedonia. During the retreat via the city of Ferdinand (now Montana), a large part of the 9th infantry division mutinied and surrendered to the Romanians on 5 July. Consequently only a small, mostly militia force remained to face the Serbian counteroffensive in the areas of Belogradchik and Vidin. 

On 8 July, the garrison of Belogradchik was overrun by the advancing Serbs of the Timok group and a small portion of Bulgarian soldiers who had survived the Serb onslaught retreated to Vidin. The next day, the Serbs entered Belogradchik while their cavalry blocked the land connection to Vidin from the rest of Bulgaria. Near the village of Bela Rada, a bloody battle was fought between the Serbian advanced guard and a Bulgarian reconnaissance squad, which then had to retreat.

Surrounding of Vidin by the Serbs
By 12 July, the Serbian Timok Army (between 16 and 21 battalions with 54 cannons, including howitzer batteries) surrounded Vidin from all directions. The city was defended by about 1,200 regular troops and 3,000 militia, armed with a total of 52 cannons (most of which were obsolete.) In general, the Bulgarians were poorly equipped and had little ammunition. On 14 July, the Serbs started to bombard the ramparts and the city itself. The Bulgarian commander, General Krastyu Marinov, refused to surrender twice. The relentless bombardment continued for three straight days, causing insignificant military casualties for the Bulgarian side.

Assault on the fortress
In the late afternoon of 17 July, after a lengthy artillery bombardment, a Serbian infantry division attacked the western sector of Vidin, located between the villages of Novoseltsi and Smardan. Two Serbian attacks had been repulsed by the Bulgarians by that evening. On 18 July, the Serbs notified General Marinov of the armistice that had been signed on the same day in Bucharest. Afterwards, the Serbians retreated from the region.

Citations

References

Further reading
 

1913 in Bulgaria
1913 in Serbia
Conflicts in 1913
Battles of the Second Balkan War
Sieges involving Bulgaria
Sieges involving Serbia
Military history of Bulgaria
Siege of Vidin (1913)
July 1913 events